{{DISPLAYTITLE:C14H20N2O2}}
The molecular formula C14H20N2O2 (molar mass: 248.32 g/mol, exact mass: 248.1525 u) may refer to:

 Bunitrolol
 Pindolol
 Piridocaine

Molecular formulas